This is a list of members of the Western Australian Legislative Council from 9 May 1898 to 14 May 1900. The chamber had 24 seats made up of eight provinces each electing three members, on a system of rotation whereby one-third of the members would retire at each biennial election.

Notes
  On 28 April 1898, Central Province MLC Edward Wittenoom resigned. William Loton was elected on 13 June 1898 to fill the remaining two years of his term.
  On 9 June 1899, East Province MLC John Taylor resigned. Henry Lukin was elected on 11 July 1899 to fill the remainder of his term.

Sources
 
 

Members of Western Australian parliaments by term